Jean Laurent Robert Borotra (13 August 1898 – 17 July 1994) was a French tennis champion. He was one of the "Four Musketeers" from his country who dominated tennis in the late 1920s and early 1930s. Borotra was imprisoned in Itter Castle during the latter years of World War II and subsequently fought in the Battle for Castle Itter.

Career
Borotra was born in Domaine du Pouy, Biarritz, Aquitaine, the oldest of four children.

Known as "the Bounding Basque", he won four Grand Slam singles titles in the French, Australian, and All England championships. The 1924 French Championship does not count towards his grand slam total as the French was only open to French nationals and members of French clubs. He only failed to win the U.S. Championships, as he was defeated in the final by his countryman René Lacoste in straight sets, thus missing a career Grand Slam. His 1924 Wimbledon victory made him the first player from outside the English-speaking world to win the tournament. His first appearance was in the French Davis Cup team of 1921. He also made the final of the World Covered Court Championships in 1922, losing to Henri Cochet, but won the doubles and mixed doubles. The other major he did well in was the World Hard Court Championships (played on clay) – he won the doubles with Henri Cochet there in 1922.

Borotra was ranked as high as world No. 1 by Bill Tilden in 1930, although Tilden didn't include himself in the ranking. He was ranked No. 2 by A. Wallis Myers of The Daily Telegraph in 1926. Borotra won his last major in 1936 when he teamed up with Marcel Bernard for the French Championship doubles at Roland Garros.

In 1974, Borotra was one of the last three people to be awarded the IOC's Olympic Diploma of Merit. And in 1976, he along with the three other Musketeers were inducted simultaneously into the International Tennis Hall of Fame in Newport, Rhode Island. In 1984, Borotra received a Distinguished Service award from the United States Sports Academy in recognition of his achievements. As the oldest living gentleman's singles champion, Borotra was invited to present the singles champion his trophy at the 100th Wimbledon Championship in 1986.

On 17 July 1994, Borotra, founder and president of honour of the CIFP (International Committee for Fair Play) died at the age of 95, after a short illness. He was buried at Arbonne.

The International Fair Play Committee, which recognises achievements annually, awards a Jean Borotra World Fair Play Trophy. In 1998, the International Club (IC) introduced the Jean Borotra Sportsmanship Award, to recognise tennis players deemed to have shown outstanding sportsmanship throughout their career.

Jean Borotra Sportsmanship Award
The Jean Borotra Sportsmanship Award is an International Club (IC) award. It was introduced in 1998 to recognise tennis players deemed to have shown outstanding sportsmanship throughout their career.

The selection process involves a panel of international tennis journalists selecting a group of players who meet the IC's core value, namely to "develop, encourage and maintain the highest standards of sportsmanship and understanding among players of all nations and among young players in particular." The shortlist is then endorsed (or added to) by the 38 International Clubs around the world, from which a winner is picked.

The recipient typically receives their award in a private ceremony in London at the All England Club during the Wimbledon Championships.

Personal life
In 1938 Borotra married Mabel de Forest and they had one son. The couple divorced in 1947. In 1988 he married Janine Bourdin.

A member of François de la Rocque's Parti social français (PSF), he became 1st General Commissioner for Education and Sports from August 1940 to April 1942 during Vichy France, leading the Révolution nationales efforts in sports policy.

Arrested by the Gestapo in November 1942, Borotra was deported to a concentration camp in Germany and then Itter Castle in North Tyrol until May 1945. He was freed from the castle after the Battle for Castle Itter, in which he played a courageous role by vaulting from the fortress and running to a nearby town to summon reinforcements.

Grand Slam finals

Singles: 10 (4 titles, 6 runners-up)

Doubles: 12 (9 titles – 3 runners-up)

Mixed doubles: 5 titles

Performance timeline

(OF) only for French club members

References

External links

 
 
 
 
 
 

1898 births
1994 deaths
Sportspeople from Biarritz
French-Basque people
French Social Party politicians
People of Vichy France
French male tennis players
Olympic tennis players of France
Olympic bronze medalists for France
French Championships (tennis) champions
Australian Championships (tennis) champions
United States National champions (tennis)
Wimbledon champions (pre-Open Era)
Olympic medalists in tennis
International Tennis Hall of Fame inductees
Grand Slam (tennis) champions in men's singles
Grand Slam (tennis) champions in mixed doubles
Grand Slam (tennis) champions in men's doubles
Recipients of the Croix de Guerre 1914–1918 (France)
Recipients of the Croix de Guerre 1939–1945 (France)
Order of the Francisque recipients
Recipients of the Resistance Medal
Commandeurs of the Légion d'honneur
Tennis players at the 1924 Summer Olympics
Medalists at the 1924 Summer Olympics
Nazi concentration camp survivors
Presidents of the International Tennis Federation
World number 1 ranked male tennis players